Prairieville is an extinct town in Pike County, in the U.S. state of Missouri. The exact location of the town site is unknown to the GNIS. The town is near .

Prairieville was established in 1842, and was abandoned in 1992. The community was so named on account of its location upon the prairie.

References

Ghost towns in Missouri
Former populated places in Pike County, Missouri